Sea glass and beach glass are naturally weathered pieces of glass, which often have the appearance of tumbled stones. "Sea glass" is physically and chemically weathered glass found on beaches along bodies of salt water. These weathering processes produce natural frosted glass. "Genuine sea glass" can be collected as a hobby and is used for decoration, most commonly in jewelry. "Beach glass" comes from fresh water and is often less frosted in appearance than sea glass. Sea glass takes 20 to 40 years, and sometimes as much as 100 to 200 years, to acquire its characteristic texture and shape. It is also colloquially referred to as "drift glass" from the longshore drift process that forms the smooth edges. In practice, the two terms are used interchangeably.

Formation

Sea glass begins as normal shards of broken glass that are then persistently tumbled and ground until the sharp edges are smoothed and rounded. In this process, the glass loses its slick surface but gains a frosted appearance over many years.

Naturally produced sea glass ("genuine sea glass") originates as pieces of glass from broken bottles, broken tableware, or even shipwrecks, which are rolled and tumbled in the ocean for years until all of their edges are rounded off, and the slickness of the glass has been worn to a frosted appearance.

Locations

 Sea glass can be found all over the world, but the beaches of the northeast United States, Bermuda, Scotland, the Isle of Man, northeast and northwest England, Mexico, Hawaii, Dominican Republic, Puerto Rico, Nova Scotia, Australia, Italy and southern Spain are noted for their abundance of sea glass, bottles, bottle lips and stoppers, art glass, marbles, and pottery shards. Most prefer to collect sea glass during spring tides (especially the perigean and proxigean tides) and during the first low tide after a storm.

Glass from inland waterways such as the Chesapeake Bay and the Great Lakes is known as beach glass. It is similar to sea glass, but in the absence of wave rigor and oceanic saline, content is typically less weathered. Beach glass from inland regions often has prominently embossed designs or letters on it, which can make tracing its origin less challenging. The outer surface of beach glass shards may also be texturally varied, with one side frosty and the other shiny. This is most likely because they are pieces broken off from larger glass objects which are themselves still embedded in mud, silt or clay, slowly being exposed by wave action and erosion.

Colors

The color of sea glass is determined by its original source, and most sea glass comes from bottles. Besides pieces of glass, colored sea pottery pieces are often also found.

The most common colors of sea glass are kelly green, brown, white, and clear. These colors predominantly come from glass bottles mostly used by companies that sell beer, juices, soft drinks, and other beverages. The clear or white glass comes from clear plates and glasses, windshields, windows, and assorted other sources.

Less common colours include jade, amber (from bottles for whiskey, medicine, spirits, and early bleach bottles), golden amber or amberina (mostly used for spirit bottles), lime green (from soda bottles during the 1960s), forest green, and ice- or soft blue (from soda bottles, medicine bottles, ink bottles, and fruit jars from the late 19th and early 20th centuries, windows, and windshields). These colors are found about once for every 25 to 100 pieces of sea glass found.

Uncommon colors of sea glass include a type of green, which comes primarily from early to mid-1900s Coca-Cola, Dr Pepper, and RC Cola bottles as well as beer bottles. Soft green colors could come from bottles that were used for ink, fruit, and baking soda. These colors are found once in every 50 to 100 pieces.

Purple sea glass is very uncommon, as is citron, opaque white (from milk bottles), cobalt and cornflower blue (from early Milk of Magnesia bottles, poison bottles, artwork, Bromo-Seltzer and Vicks VapoRub containers), and aqua (from Ball Mason jars and certain 19th century glass bottles). These colors are found once for every 200 to 1,000 pieces found.

Extremely rare colors include gray, pink (often from Great Depression-era plates), teal (often from Mateus wine bottles), black (older, very dark olive green glass), yellow (often from 1930s Vaseline containers), turquoise (from tableware and art glass), red (often from old Schlitz bottles, car tail lights, dinnerware, or nautical lights, it is found once in about every 5,000 pieces), and orange (the least common type of sea glass, found once in about 10,000 pieces). These colors are found once for every 1,000 to 10,000 pieces collected. Some shards of black glass are quite old, originating from thick eighteenth-century gin, beer, and wine bottles.

Antique black sea glass

Old black glass bottles that had iron slag added during production to increase strength and opaqueness were at times broken in shipment. These were then jettisoned at the beachside wharf upon landfall. They originally contained such things as wine, gin, whiskey, medicines, and liquids subject to light damage. The bottles that survived the long and often rough voyage were refilled once emptied of the original contents and recycled, sometimes for many decades. They were refilled with local spirits, herbal tinctures, extracts, and medicinals.

As the glass craft gained knowledge the bottles became thinner. Quality improved in glass formulations and purity, as well as strides in technical improvements in glass-making techniques all aid in placing a piece of sea glass in a loosely defined era. Along with knowledge of historical trading partners that visited the search locations, production sources can be deduced, but a single feature is not a reliable indicator of origin. Many similar features over a broad sample narrow the choices. Particular substances became associated with certain color, and shapes of bottles. These all help define country of origin. Medicines and liquor were often sold in green bottles; olive green was the most common color for gin, but brown was also used as well as cobalt blue. Whiskey was contained in green and brown bottles as well. The liquor bottles for sea shipment were oftentimes square so as to use space more efficiently in shipping crates. Poisons were almost always in blue bottles. Round, mallet, and squat cylinder black glass bottles were all made, and shape correlates to age of the bottles with some overlap. Correlations exist today: brown beer bottles, and of course the globally recognized shape of the Coca-Cola green glass bottle.

In the Caribbean, many nations traded, and pirates plundered them all. So glass from many producer countries can be found with examples going back to the 15th century. Old slave trading ports are good search locations. As are former colonial ports in the slave-molasses-rum triangle. All former colonial locations with sea trade routes, and the motherland shipping ports are prime search areas.

For instance, in Jamaica there are influxes of Spanish, African, English, American, East Indian, Chinese, and Jews (who incidentally arrived about the same time Christopher Columbus' son arrived to settle the island in 1510 and many later shipped with the Caribbean pirate crews) and other Europeans scattered throughout the historical record. The majority of black glass found on the island of Jamaica is English glass produced from the later 1600s until the 1800s in England. Sea glass arrived in Jamaica with the old world supply chain first established in the 15th century. The Spanish considered Santiago (Jamaica) a backwater to Cuba, and this allowed the English to relieve them of it in 1655 without much resistance. The first man-made glass most likely arrived with Christopher Columbus on his 2nd voyage when he claimed the island for Spain in 1494. He is reported to have landed at Dry Harbor, Discovery Bay on the north coast. Whether any of the glass on board became sea glass is part of the romance and wonder of beachcombing.

Black glass is often green or brown when held up to light, although it appears black to the unaided eye. Weathering and oxidation, together with UV light interacting with metallic oxides and chemicals in the glass and seawater are all factors affecting the color of sea glass over long exposure and time frames. In texture and color black sea glass resembles black beach rock, very much resembling the extrusive igneous rock basalt, or weathered black obsidian, a natural black volcanic glass. Gas bubbles are often trapped in old glass, impurities and irregularities in the original bottles were common and one indicator of age. Early examples were hand blown, later ones utilized a mold. Due to the inherent strength, larger pieces of old black glass are more common, including pieces that survived for centuries. Potential age of black beach glass found depends on the search location. Small pieces require a trained eye to spot. Texture, along with color, are useful in searches. Black glass is the rarest of all the sea/beach glasses due to age and difficulty in finding it. However, if a reliable location is found, it can produce a considerable amount of material.

Collectors should be aware of the historical nature of the location, and the fact that gathering old items is considered cultural theft in some areas of the world. In other areas sea glass is just another piece of trash on the beach. Most sea glass' historical context is lost to the sea, but its mere presence in some areas is the heritage and legacy of the location. National treasures made of former trash exist, such as is Glass Beach at Fort Bragg, California. The glass at Fort Bragg is mostly from the mid-20th century.

Hobby
Like collecting shells, fossils, or stones, combing shorelines for sea glass is a hobby many beach-goers and beachcombers enjoy. Hobbyists often fill decorative jars with their collections and take great pleasure in tracing a shard's provenance while artisans craft pieces of jewelry, stained glass and other decorative pieces from sea glass. Some collectors use their collections in creating works of art by putting them in cement or other adhesive to create a mosaic. 

In North America, the hobby has the North American Sea Glass Association, which organizes a yearly conference and issues a newsletter. There is also a guide that includes a survey of major sea glass collectors and the artists that use it to create a variety of items.

Artificial

Authentic sea and beach glass is becoming rarer and harder to find. More people are actively searching for it, and the shift to other materials such as plastic for containers has greatly reduced the number of glass containers dumped in the sea.

This scarcity has led to some artisans and crafters tumbling poorer pieces of sea glass shards to create what is called "twice-tossed" glass, while others create artificial sea glass, or "craft glass", from ordinary glass pieces using a rock tumbler. While such glass is chunkier than most true sea glass, lacks its romantic provenance, and differs in many technical ways (e.g., long-term exposure to water conditions creates an etched surface on the glass that cannot be duplicated artificially), it does meet the demand of crafters at a cheaper price and in a wider range of colors. In order to make artificial sea glass, a tumbler, sand, and glass are necessary.  

A number of characteristics highlight the differences between artificial sea glass and natural sea glass, starting with the coloration and surface texture of each piece. An example of natural sea glass will usually have a frosty, almost powdery texture at different points. One of the most reliable indicators for natural sea glass is a "C" shaped design all over the outside of the sample. If the design is located on the piece, it is authentic sea glass, since artificial glass will typically not have that particular design. Sea glass usually comes from broken glass bottles or other household items, so pieces found on beaches will not be perfectly shaped, unlike artificial sea glass, often sold as beach glass.

See also 
 Glass Beach (Fort Bragg, California)

References

Further reading
 
 National Geographic magazine, "Environment" section: "The Shard Way", August 2008
 http://www.microscopy-uk.org.uk/mag/artnov11macro/JosephineWyman/JW_SeaGlassArticle.pdf

External links

 North American Sea Glass Association
 Fortune Small Business magazine article on sea glass collection
 Washington Post article on sea glass collection and sales
 Photographic Exploration of Sea Glass- Josephine Wyman
 Brief summary/discussion about Sea Glass / Beach Glass

Glass in nature
Ocean pollution
Glass beaches